Arcade Game Construction Kit is a 1988 game creation system for making arcade-style games. It was developed by Mike Livesay and published by Broderbund for the Commodore 64. AGCK contained four floppy disks. The program uses a joystick-driven menu system and includes six pre-made games to learn from and play.

Included games

AGCK TUTORIAL GAME -- This is a simple variation on classic arcade shooters such as Galaxian.
KANGARANG (designed by Gregory Hammond) -- The player is a kangaroo mother looking to rescue its baby and return to safety. Hazards include falling boulders, jumping fish, monkeys and natives.
ISLE QUEST (designed by Greg Johnson and Paul Reiche III) -- The player is a brave explorer in search of new lands and riches.  Hazards include pirate ships, hostile natives.
MUSASHI (designed by Greg Johnson and Paul Reiche III) -- The player is an ancient samurai warrior looking to rescue his princess. The player must fight  through a fortress, collecting gold, sushi, and the mighty Sword of the Samurai.
GERG'S ADVENTURE  (designed by Gregory Hammond) -- The player is Gerg, a tiny creature who wants to get back to his home. Gerg must pick up a variety of orbs to power up, and to clear each level.
SPACE WORRIES (designed by Paul Reiche III and Greg Johnson) -- The player controls a space ship, looking to collect mysterious metallic cylinders to destroy an enemy that has taken control of your planet.

See also 
 The Arcade Machine
 Garry Kitchen's GameMaker
 Shoot'Em-Up Construction Kit

References 

1988 video games
Broderbund games
Commodore 64 games
Commodore 64-only games
Video game engines
Video game development software
Video games developed in the United States